Horsley Towers, East Horsley, Surrey, England is a country house dating from the 19th century. The house was designed by Charles Barry for the banker William Currie. The East Horsley estate was later sold to William King-Noel, 1st Earl of Lovelace who undertook two major expansions of the house to his own designs. Lovelace lived at the Towers with his wife, Ada, daughter of Lord Byron, a pioneering mathematician, friend of Charles Babbage and described as among the first computer programmers. In 1919, the Towers was purchased by Thomas Sopwith, the aviator and businessman, who named his plane, the Hawker Horsley, after his home. Now a wedding and conference venue, Horsley Towers is a Grade II* listed building.

History
William Currie was a banker and distiller, who had inherited a substantial fortune from his father, on the latter's death in 1781. In 1820, Currie engaged Charles Barry to replace the existing Georgian manor house on his East Horsley estate. It was an early commission for Barry, then aged 25, who opened the London office of his architectural practice only in 1821. Following Currie's death in 1829, the Horsley estate was bought by William King, who was raised in the peerage to Earl of Lovelace in 1838 and served as Lord Lieutenant of Surrey from 1840 until his death in 1893. King had married Augusta Ada Byron, Lord Byron's only legitimate offspring in 1833.

Lovelace, who began his career as a diplomat, turned to scientific investigation and engineering after inheriting his title. A roof truss in the great hall he designed at Horsley carries an inscription recording that Lovelace had moulded the beam with the use of steam. Ada gained even greater prominence for her scientific endeavours; through her friendship with Charles Babbage she wrote a commentary on his analytical engine, arguably the earliest mechanical computer. Her commentary has been described as containing "one of the earliest computer programmes".

In 1919 the third earl sold the East Horsley estate to Thomas Sopwith, the aviator and businessman for £150,000. While resident at the Towers, Sopwith named one of his aircraft, the Hawker Horsley, after the house. After World War II, the house was purchased by the Electricity Council for use as a management training college. It is now a wedding and conference venue operated by De Vere.

Architecture and description
Pevsner describes the approach to the Towers as "one of the most sensational in England". The core of the present house is Barry's building of 1820–1829, undertaken in the Tudor Revival style. This is enveloped with a great hall, built by Lovelace in 1849, and by even larger flanking towers, in Romanesque and Rhenish styles, and a chapel, all dating from 1859 and after, and drawing inspiration from a long European tour Lovelace undertook following Ada's death in 1852. The whole is encircled by a complex of walls, tunnels, arches, bastions and a lengthy cloister. The construction materials are mainly local flint and brick, Lovelace purchasing a brickworks at Ockham to ensure a ready supply.

Horsley Towers is a Grade II* listed building. The flanking walls and pavilions to the northwest and southwest, the entrance walls and lodges, one of which Nairn describes as "particularly violent", and the walls to the former kitchen garden, all have their own Grade II listings.

Neither Barry nor Lovelace's efforts have been much appreciated by critics. The Victorian Web notes that "the building, like much Victorian gothic, displays a good deal of eccentricity and mixes many styles". Ian Nairn, the main author of the Surrey Pevsner, wrote of Barry's Tudor Revival house; "a sober, dull design with the [...] lack of enthusiasm which taints so many of Barry's non-Classical buildings". Of Lovelace's work, Mark Girouard, the architectural historian, described the "extraordinary embellishments, in flint and 
polychrome brick made by the Earl, working to his own designs". The writer John Julius Norwich considered the whole "a grotesque Victorian Disneyland which has to be seen to be believed - and may not be even then", concluding that, unusually, his inclusion of Horsley Towers in his study The Architecture of Southern England, should serve as a warning rather than an inducement.

Gallery

Footnotes

References

Sources
 
 
 
 
 

Country houses in Surrey
Grade II* listed houses
Grade II* listed buildings in Surrey